The qualifying rounds for the 1996 US Open were played from 22 to 25 August 1996 at the USTA National Tennis Center in Flushing Meadows, New York City, United States.

Seeds

Qualifiers

Lucky losers

Draw

First qualifier

Second qualifier

Third qualifier

Fourth qualifier

References
 Official Results Archive (WTA)
1996 US Open – Women's draws and results at the International Tennis Federation

Women's Doubles Qualifying
US Open (tennis) by year – Qualifying